is a Japanese company which derives most of its revenue from milling flour and produces flour related products such as noodles. It was established in 1896 and is a member of the Mitsui keiretsu.

Nippon Flour Mills (NFM) and its group companies engage in a wide range of food businesses that include flour milling, the core business of NFM; food business consisting of manufacture and sale of food ingredients, processed foods, Nakashoku (meal solutions), frozen foods; manufacture and sale of health foods, cosmetics and pet foods; and other businesses including management of sports facilities and bioscience business.

References

External links

Nippon Flour Mills Japanese site 
Nippon Flour Mills global site 

Food and drink companies based in Tokyo
Snack food manufacturers of Japan
Manufacturing companies based in Tokyo
Service companies based in Tokyo
Companies listed on the Tokyo Stock Exchange
Food and drink companies established in 1896
Japanese companies established in 1896
Japanese brands
Mitsui